Carol Potter is an American poet and professor known for writing the book Some Slow Bees. She currently teaches at Antioch University.

Early life and education 
Potter was born and raised in northwestern Connecticut. She earned her B.A. in English/Journalism, Women's Studies from the University of Massachusetts Amherst and her MFA from the MFA Program for Poets & Writers there, as well as her Certificate in Women's Studies.

Career 
She is the 2014 winner of the FIELD Poetry Prize from Oberlin College Press for her book, Some Slow Bees.  Her previous collection of poems is Otherwise Obedient (Red Hen Press, 2007), which was a 2008 Lambda Literary Award finalist. Her poems have appeared in literary journals and magazines including Poetry Magazine, FIELD, The Massachusetts Review, The American Poetry Review, Iowa Review, Women's Review of Books, Prairie Schooner, Maize, The Journal, and Arts & Letters, and in anthologies, including Pushcart XXVI. She won the 2004 dA Center for the Arts Poetry Award and has received residency and fellowship grants from MacDowell Colony, Yaddo, Fundacion Valparaiso, Villa Montalvo, Centrum, and the Millay Colony for the Arts. She was also Writer-in-Residence at Thurber House in 2003, and Visiting Poet at the Indiana University MFA Program (2003–2004).

Potter taught for 17 years at Holyoke Community College, currently teaches in the MFA program at Antioch University in Los Angeles, as well as at the Community College of Vermont in Newport, and lives in Vermont's Northeast Kingdom.

Published works
 Before We Were Born (Alice James Books, 1990)
 Upside Down in the Dark (Alice James Books, 1995)
 Short History of Pets (Cleveland State University Poetry Center, 2000)
 Otherwise Obedient (Red Hen Press, 2007)
 Some Slow Bees (Oberlin College Press, 2015)

Awards and honors
1986: Tom McAfee Discovery Award from The Missouri Review
1990: New Letters Award for Poetry
1999: The Balcones Poetry Prize from Austin Community College
1999: Cleveland State University Poetry Center Award
2001: Pushcart Prize
2001: The Balcones Poetry Prize from Austin Community College
2004: dA Center for the Arts Poetry Award
2008: Lambda Literary Award finalist
2014: FIELD Poetry Prize from Oberlin College Press
2015: Ekphrasis Prize for Poetry

References

External links
 Carol Potter's Website
 Alice James Books Website > Author Page, Carol Potter
 Red Hen Press Website > Author Page, Carol Potter
 Poem: AGNI Online Authors & Articles > Once in an Insurance Company in Boston by Carol Potter

Year of birth missing (living people)
Living people
American women poets
Antioch College
Writers from Vermont
Writers from Connecticut
University of Massachusetts Amherst MFA Program for Poets & Writers alumni
Indiana University faculty
American women academics
21st-century American women writers